Earth is a 1996 Spanish film directed by Julio Medem, starring Carmelo Gómez and Emma Suárez. It was entered into the 1996 Cannes Film Festival.

The story centres on a small rural town whose wine industry is being plagued by grubs in the soil. Ángel (played by Gómez), an exterminator recently released from mental hospital, arrives to deal with the pests and becomes involved with two of the local women.

Cast
 Carmelo Gómez - Ángel Bengoetxeo
 Emma Suárez - Ángela
 Karra Elejalde - Patricio
 Silke - Mari
 Nancho Novo - Julio
 Txema Blasco - Tomás
 Ane Sánchez - Hija de Ángela
 Juan José Suárez - Manuel
 Ricardo Amador - Charly
 César Vea - Miñón (as Cesare Vea)
 Pepe Viyuela - Ulloa
 Alicia Agut - Cristina
 Miguel Palenzuela - Tío de Ángel
 Vicente Haro - Mayor (as Vicente Haro Marón)
 Adelfina Serrano - Concha

References

External links
 

1996 films
1990s Spanish-language films
1996 drama films
Films directed by Julio Medem
Films set in Aragon
Spanish drama films
1990s Spanish films